U-505 is a German Type IXC submarine built for Germany's Kriegsmarine during World War II. She was captured by the U.S. Navy on 4 June 1944.

In her uniquely unlucky career with the Kriegsmarine, she had the distinction of being the "most heavily damaged U-boat to successfully return to port" in World War II on her fourth patrol, and the only submarine in which a commanding officer killed himself in combat conditions on her tenth patrol, following six botched patrols. She was captured on 4 June 1944 by United States Navy Task Group 22.3 (TG 22.3), one of six U-boats that were captured by Allied forces during World War II. All but one of U-505s crew were rescued by the Navy task group. The submarine was towed to Bermuda in secret and her crew were interned at a US prisoner of war camp, where they were denied access to International Red Cross visits. The Navy classified the capture as top secret and prevented the Germans from discovering it.

In 1954, U-505 was donated to the Museum of Science and Industry in Chicago, Illinois.

Design
German Type IXC submarines were slightly larger than the original Type IXBs. U-505 had a displacement of  when at the surface and  while submerged. She had two shafts and two  propellers.

U-505 was fitted with six  torpedo tubes (four fitted at the bow and two at the stern), 22 torpedoes, one  SK C/32 naval gun, 180 rounds, and a  SK C/30 as well as a  C/30 anti-aircraft gun. The boat had a complement of forty-eight.

Service history
U-505s keel was laid down on 12 June 1940 by Deutsche Werft in Hamburg, Germany as yard number 295. She was launched on 24 May 1941 and commissioned on 26 August with Kapitänleutnant Axel-Olaf Loewe in command. On 6 September 1942, Loewe was relieved by Kptlt. Peter Zschech. On 24 October 1943, Oberleutnant zur See Paul Meyer took command for about two weeks until he was relieved on 8 November by Oblt.z.S. Harald Lange, who commanded the boat until her capture on 4 June 1944.

She conducted 12 patrols in her career, sinking eight ships totaling . Three of these were American, two British, one Norwegian, one Dutch, and one Colombian.

First patrol
U-505 was assigned as an operational boat to the 2nd U-boat Flotilla on 1 February 1942, following training exercises with the 4th U-boat Flotilla from 26 August 1941 to 31 January 1942. She began her first patrol from Kiel on 19 January while still formally undergoing training. For 16 days, she circumnavigated the British Isles and docked at Lorient in occupied France on 3 February. She engaged no enemy vessels and was not attacked.

Second patrol
U-505 left Lorient on 11 February 1942 on her second patrol. In 86 days, she traveled to the west coast of Africa where she sank her first vessels. On 18 April, U-505 was attacked by an Allied aircraft in the mid-Atlantic but suffered little damage.

Third patrol
U-505 began her third patrol on 7 June 1942, after leaving her home port of Lorient. Urious was a sailing ship belonging to a Colombian diplomat, so its sinking gave Colombia political grounds to declare war on Germany. U-505 then returned to Lorient on 25 August after 80 days on patrol without being attacked.

Fourth patrol
U-505s fourth patrol sent her to the northern coast of South America. She left Lorient on 4 October and sank the British vessel Ocean Justice off the coast of Venezuela on 7 November. On 10 November near Trinidad, U-505 was surprised on the surface by a Lockheed Hudson maritime patrol aircraft from No. 53 Squadron, Royal Air Force, which made a low-level attack, landing a  bomb directly on the deck from just above water level. The explosion killed one watch officer and wounded another in the conning tower. It also tore the anti-aircraft gun off its mounting and severely damaged the ship's pressure hull. The aircraft was hit by fragmentation from the bomb's explosion and crashed into the ocean near U-505, killing RAAF pilot Flight Sergeant Ronald Sillcock and his entire crew. With the pumps inoperative and water flooding the engine room in several places, Kptlt. Zschech ordered the crew to abandon ship, but the technical staff (led by Chief Petty Officer Otto Fricke) insisted on trying to save her. The vessel was made water-tight after almost two weeks of repair work. After sending the wounded watch officer to the supply submarine ("milk cow") , U-505 limped back to Lorient on reduced power.

Aborted patrols
After six months in Lorient for repairs, U-505 started her fifth patrol. She left Lorient on 1 July 1943 and returned after 13 days, after an attack by three British destroyers that had stalked her for over 30 hours. While U-505 was not badly damaged in this encounter, she had to return to France for repairs. U-505s next four patrols were all aborted after only a few days at sea, due to equipment failure and sabotage by French dockworkers working for the Resistance. Faults found included sabotaged electrical and radar equipment, a hole deliberately drilled in a diesel fuel tank, and faulty welds on parts repaired by French workers. This happened so many times that she became the butt of jokes throughout the base at Lorient. Upon returning from one botched patrol her crew found a sign painted in the docking area reading: "U-505s Hunting Ground". At a time when many U-boats were being sunk, U-505s commander, Kptlt. Zschech, overheard another U-boat commander joke, "There is one commander who will always come back ... Zschech."

Tenth patrol and Zschech's suicide
After ten months in Lorient, U-505 departed for her tenth Atlantic patrol, seeking to break her run of bad luck and bad morale. British destroyers spotted her east of the Azores on 24 October 1943, not long after crossing the Bay of Biscay, and she was forced to submerge and endure a severe depth-charge attack. Zschech committed suicide in the submarine's control room, shooting himself in the head in front of his crew. First watch officer Paul Meyer took command and returned the boat to port with minimal damage. Meyer was "absolved from all blame" by the Kriegsmarine for the incident. Zschech is recorded as the only submariner during the war to commit suicide underwater in response to the stress of a prolonged depth charging.

Eleventh patrol
Zschech was replaced as commander by Oblt.z.S. Harald Lange. U-505s eleventh patrol began on Christmas Day 1943.

U-505 took part in wolfpack Hela from 28 December 1943 until 1 January 1944.

Twelfth patrol and capture

Anti-sub task force
The Allies had learned from decrypted German messages that U-boats were operating near Cape Verde, but not their exact locations. The US Navy dispatched Task Group 22.3 to the area, a Hunter-killer Group commanded by Captain Daniel V. Gallery. The group sailed from Norfolk, Virginia on 15 May 1944 and began searching for U-boats in the area in late May, using high-frequency direction-finding fixes ("Huff-Duff") and air and surface reconnaissance.

Detection and attack
The escorts immediately moved towards the contact, while Guadalcanal moved away at top speed and launched a Grumman F4F Wildcat fighter to join another Wildcat and a Grumman TBM Avenger torpedo bomber which were already airborne.

Chatelain was so close to U-505 that depth charges would not sink fast enough to intercept the U-boat, so she fired Hedgehog anti-submarine mortars before passing the submarine and turning to make a follow-up attack with depth charges. One of the aircraft sighted U-505 and fired into the water to mark the position while Chatelain dropped depth charges. Immediately after the detonation of the charges, a large oil slick spread on the water and the fighter pilot radioed: "You struck oil! Sub is surfacing!" Chatelain immediately opened fire on it with all available weapons, joined by other ships of the task force and the two Wildcats.

Lange believed U-505 to be seriously damaged and ordered his crew to abandon ship. They obeyed the order promptly, but they did not successfully scuttle the boat; they opened some valves but left the engines running. The commanding officer of Chatelain saw the submarine turning toward his ship and thought that she was about to attack, so he ordered a single torpedo to be fired at it; the torpedo missed, passing ahead of the abandoned U-505.

Salvage operations

Chatelain and Jenks collected survivors while an eight-man party from Pillsbury led by Lt. Albert David came alongside the submarine in a boat and entered through the conning tower. They found the body of Signalman First Class Gottfried Fischer on the deck, the only fatality of the combat, and U-505 was deserted. They secured charts and codebooks, closed scuttling valves, and disarmed demolition charges. They stopped the water coming in and the submarine remained afloat, although it was low in the water and down by the stern, and they also stopped her engines. U-boat researcher Derek Waller has written that a German crewman, Ewald Felix, helped foil the scuttling attempt.

Pillsbury attempted to take the submarine in tow but repeatedly collided with her and had to move away with three compartments flooded. A second boarding party from Guadalcanal then rigged a towline from the aircraft carrier to the U-boat. Guadalcanals chief engineer Commander Earl Trosino joined the salvage party. He disconnected the submarine's diesels from her electric driving motors while leaving them clutched to the propeller shafts. With the U-boat moving under tow by Guadalcanal, the propellers "windmilled" as they passed through the water, turning the shafts and the drive motors. This caused the motors to act as electrical generators charging the batteries. With power from the batteries, U-505s pumps cleared out the water let in by the attempted scuttling, and her air compressors blew out the ballast tanks, bringing her up to full surface trim.

Despite the capture taking place close to French Morocco, Casablanca was known to be infiltrated by German spies and thus another safe port was needed to house the submarine. After three days of towing, Guadalcanal transferred U-505 to the fleet tug . The US Navy took 58 prisoners from U-505, three of them wounded. The crew were interned at Camp Ruston, near Ruston, Louisiana. Secrecy was so important to the mission that the submarine's flag was kept under the personal care of the Commander in Chief of the Atlantic Fleet during the duration of the war.

Awards
US Chief of Naval Operations Admiral Ernest King considered court-martialling Captain Gallery because he towed U-505 instead of sinking it after capturing the code books. The submarine's crewmen were isolated from other prisoners of war, and the Red Cross was denied access to them. The Kriegsmarine finally declared the crew dead and informed the families to that effect, and the crew were not returned until 1947.

LTJG Albert David received the Medal of Honor for leading the boarding party, the only time that it was awarded to an Atlantic Fleet sailor in World War II. Torpedoman's Mate Third Class Arthur W. Knispel and Radioman Second Class Stanley E. Wdowiak were the first two to follow David into the submarine, and they received the Navy Cross. Seaman First Class Earnest James Beaver received the Silver Star and Commander Trosino received the Legion of Merit. Captain Gallery conceived and executed the operation, and he received the Navy Distinguished Service Medal. The Task Group was awarded the Presidential Unit Citation. Admiral Royal E. Ingersoll, Commander in Chief, US Atlantic Fleet, cited the Task Group for "outstanding performance during anti-submarine operations in the eastern Atlantic" and stated that it was "a feat unprecedented in individual and group bravery, execution, and accomplishment in the Naval History of the United States".

Final journey
The US Navy kept U-505 at the US Naval Operating Base in Bermuda, and Navy intelligence officers and engineers studied it intensively. To maintain the illusion that she had been sunk rather than captured, she was painted to look like a US submarine and renamed USS Nemo. At the end of the war in Europe, she was used to promote E War Bond sales as part of the "Mighty 7th" War Loan drive. Anyone who purchased a bond could also purchase a ticket to board and inspect her. In June 1945, she visited New York City, Philadelphia, and Baltimore. Captain Gallery was present for the opening of the exhibition in Washington, D.C.

The Navy had no further use for U-505 after the war. Experts had thoroughly examined her in Bermuda, and she was moored derelict at the Portsmouth Navy Yard, so the Navy decided to use her as a target for gunnery and torpedo practice until she sank. In 1946, Rear Admiral Gallery, who opposed the Navy's plans for U-505, told his brother Father John Gallery about this plan, and Father John contacted President Lenox Lohr of Chicago's Museum of Science and Industry (MSI) to see if they would be interested in it. The museum already planned to display a submarine, and the acquisition of U-505 seemed ideal. The US government donated the submarine to the museum in September 1954, and Chicago residents raised $250,000 for transporting and installing the boat. Coast Guard tugboats and cutters towed the boat through the Great Lakes, making a stop in Detroit, Michigan, in July 1954. The museum dedicated it on 25 September 1954 as a permanent exhibit and a war memorial to all the sailors who died in the first and second Battle of the Atlantic.

Museum ship

Nearly every removable part had been stripped from the boat's interior by the time she went to the museum; she was in no condition to serve as an exhibit, so Museum director Lohr asked for replacements from the German manufacturers who had supplied the boat's original components and parts. Admiral Gallery reports in his autobiography Eight Bells and All's Well that every company supplied the requested parts without charge. Most included letters to the effect that the manufacturers wanted her to be a credit to German technology.

A reunion was held at the museum in 1964, 20 years after the ship's capture, where Gallery returned to Lange a set of binoculars from the ship that had belonged to him.

The Navy had removed the periscope and placed it in a water tank used for research at its Arctic Submarine Laboratory in Point Loma, California; they demolished that lab in 2003 and found it. The Navy donated it to the museum to be displayed along with the submarine. By 2004, the U-boat's exterior had suffered noticeable damage from the weather, so the museum moved it to a new climate-controlled location (under ground next to the CMofSI) in April 2004. They restored it and reopened it to the public on 5 June 2005.

In 2019, the Museum of Science and Industry refurbished the submarine, restoring it to be closer to its original condition.  Also, a special exhibit with many additional artifacts from the sub was opened in the general admission section of the museum.

In popular culture
Captain Gallery recounted the capture of U-505 in his 1951 memoir Clear the Decks. Gary Moore recounts the story of the captured crew in his 2006 non-fiction book Playing with the Enemy. Hans Goebeler recounts the story of the boat's patrols and her crew in his 2005 memoir Steel Boats, Iron Hearts: A U-Boat Crewman's Life Aboard U-505.

Summary of raiding history

See also

Wartime captured German U-boats
 
 , later HMS Graph

Surviving German U-boats
 SM U-1

Other
 List of submarine museums
 Playing With the Enemy
 U-571

References

Bibliography

Gallery, Daniel V. (1958). We Captured a U-Boat. London: The Popular Book Company.
Gallery, Daniel V. (1978). U-505. New York: Warner Books. 

Goebeler, Hans Jacob, with Vanzo, John. (1999) Steel Boats, Iron Hearts: The Wartime Saga of Hans Goebeler and U-505 (Wagnerian Publications). OCLC . This privately distributed paperback book was later reprinted as 
 

Harris, Wesley. (2006). Fish Out of Water: Nazi Submariners as Prisoners in North Louisiana During World War II. RoughEdge Publications.

Kohnen, David. "Tombstone of Victory: Tracking the U-505 From German Commerce Raider to American War Memorial, 1944–1954" in The Journal of America's Military Past (Winter 2007).
Kohnen, David. Commanders Winn and Knowles: Winning the U-boat War with Intelligence, 1939–1943 (Enigma Press, 1999).
Kohnen, David. "F-21 and F-211: A Fresh Look into the Secret Room" in Randy C. Bolano and Craig L. Symonds, ed., New Sources in Naval History: Selected Papers from the Fourteenth Naval History Symposium (Naval Institute, 2001).
Moore, Gary W. (2006) Playing with the Enemy: A Baseball Prodigy, a World at War, and a Field of Broken Dreams. Savas Beatie LLC, New York, NY.
 Popular description of the capture of U-505 by a former naval officer and professor.
Savas, Theodore P., Editor. (2004) Hunt and Kill: U-505 and the U-boat War in the Atlantic. Savas Beatie LLC, New York, NY.

External links

 U-505 at MSIChicago.org
 U-505 at uboatarchive.net

 U-505 at HNSA Ship (archived) 
 
 Panel Discussion, Pritzker Military Library, 4 February 2013, about the U-505 moderated by John Allen Williams with panelists Marc Milner, Stephen Budiansky and Kurt Haunfelner
  Oberfunkmatt Gottfried Fischer's personal diary

1941 ships
Captured U-boats
German Type IX submarines
History of cryptography
Military and war museums in Illinois
Museums in Chicago
Museum ships in Illinois
National Historic Landmarks in Chicago
National Register of Historic Places in Chicago
Naval ships of Germany captured by the United States during World War II
Ships built in Hamburg
Ships on the National Register of Historic Places in Illinois
Ships preserved in museums
U-boats commissioned in 1941
Vessels captured by the United States Navy
World War II submarines of Germany
World War II on the National Register of Historic Places
Military history of Bermuda during World War II
Weapons and ammunition introduced in 1941